Everton Camargo (born 25 May 1991) is a Brazilian professional footballer who currently plays as a striker for Hong Kong Premier League club Lee Man.

Club career
Camargo signed with BC Glory Sky in the summer of 2016. Prior to that, he was playing at Wong Tai Sin.

On 15 July 2017, Yuen Long announced the signing of Camargo as a free agent during their 2017–18 season kick off event. During a 2017–18 Senior Shield semi final match against Kitchee, Camargo scored two goals in a 3–1 upset over the Hong Kong Premier League champions. He would later help the club to an improbable Senior Shield title.

On 1 July 2018, Eastern formally announced that they had signed Camargo after months of speculation. On 31 May 2022, Camargo left the club after finishing his contract.

On 12 July 2022, it was announced that Camargo had joined Lee Man.

Career statistics

Club 
As of 21 May 2021

Honours

Club 
Yuen Long
Hong Kong Senior Shield: 2017–18

Eastern
Hong Kong FA Cup: 2019–20
Hong Kong Senior Shield: 2019–20

Individual 

 Hong Kong Premier League Team of the Year: 2017–18
Hong Kong Premier League Player of the Year: 2019–20
Hong Kong Sports Press Association “most favourite player": 2019–20

References

External links
 
 Everton Camargo at HKFA
 

Brazilian footballers
Brazilian expatriate sportspeople in Hong Kong
Expatriate footballers in Hong Kong
Hong Kong Premier League players
Yuen Long FC players
Eastern Sports Club footballers
Lee Man FC players
1991 births
Living people
Association football forwards